Gerdt may refer to:
Zinovy Efimovich Gerdt, Russian actor
Pavel Andreyevich Gerdt or Paul Gerdt (1844–1917), Russian dancer for the Mariinsky Theatre
Elizaveta Pavlovna Gerdt (Елизавета Павловна Гердт) (1891–1975), Russian dancer and teacher
Petri Erkki Tapio Gerdt (1983–2002), Finnish chemistry student and Myyrmanni bombing culprit
Tuomas Gerdt (1922–2020), Finnish soldier, last living Knight of the Mannerheim Cross

Surnames from given names